Tiago André Santos Fernandes (born ), also known as Tiaguinho, is a Portuguese futsal player who plays as a winger for the Portugal national team and for Quinta dos Lombos on loan from Benfica. Tiaguinho has previously played for Braga/AAUM and Modicus Sandim, both also on loan from Benfica.

References

External links

Tiaguinho at playmakerstats.com (formerly thefinalball.com)

1998 births
Living people
Portuguese men's futsal players
S.L. Benfica futsal players